Vladyslav Serhiyovych Ostrovskyi (born 13 September 2004) is a Ukrainian professional football striker who plays for Metalist 1925 Kharkiv.

Career
Ostrovskyi is a product of the Zirka and #26 youth sportive school systems from Kyiv.

He signed a contract with the Ukrainian Premier League side Metalist 1925 Kharkiv in July 2021 and made his debut in the Ukrainian Premier League for Metalist 1925 as a second half-time substituted player in a losing away match against Chornomorets Odesa on 12 December 2021.

His contract was terminated due to 2022 Russian invasion of Ukraine and on 10 April 2021 he moved to Spanish Segunda División club CD Lugo.

References

External links

2004 births
Living people
Footballers from Kharkiv
Ukrainian footballers
Association football forwards
FC Metalist 1925 Kharkiv players
CD Lugo players
Ukrainian Premier League players
Ukrainian expatriate footballers
Expatriate footballers in Spain
Ukrainian expatriate sportspeople in Spain